Ajuwaya is a 2017 Nigerian movie  produced and directed by Tolu Awobiyi Lord Tanner.  The adventure movie stars Timini Egbuson, Lanre Hassan, Etinosa Idemudia, Kemi Lala Akindoju and Rahama Sadau.

Synopsis 
The movie revolves around six National Youth Service Corps members who were posted to a village in Osun State for their youth service. The story became complicated when the said corp members revived a long-aged evil in the community.

Premiere 
The movie was premiered nationwide on July 7, 2019.

Cast 
Kemi Lala Akindoju
Rahama Sadau
Christopher Darko, 
Timini Egbuson
Lanre Hassan
Etinosa Idemudia
Dec Imafidon
George Kalu
Tolu Lordtanner
Feyifunmi Oginni
Suara Olayinka
Sanni Omozieghele
Osunbiyi Taiwo.

External links 
 Imdb

References 

2017 films
Nigerian adventure films
Nigerian films based on actual events
English-language Nigerian films